Preethse Preethse is a 2009 Indian Kannada-language film directed by K Madesh  starring Yogesh, Udhayathara and Pragna in the lead roles.

Cast

 Yogesh as Mada a.k.a. Akash
 Udhayathara as Aishwarya
 Pragna as Bipasa
 Jai Jagadish as Akash's adopted father
 Sangeetha as Akash's adopted mother
 Ramesh Bhat 
 Rangayana Raghu 
 P. N. Sathya
 Umesh
 Honnavalli Krishna

Music

Reception

Critical response 

R G Vijayasarathy of Rediff.com scored the film at 1.5 out of 5 stars and says "Anoop Sileen's music is good. Songs like Preethse Preethse, Loose Maada, and Urige Baare are well picturised while the Bangkok song has only sex and glitz. Preethse Preethse can be enjoyed only by Yogish's fans. Otherwise it is just an ordinary film". A critic from The New Indian Express wrote "Music director Anup Cylin has done a good job with the songs. It is worth watching only if you are a die-hard fan of Yogeesh alias Loose Mada and do not care for anything else". BS Srivani from Deccan Herald wrote "Madesh takes the audience on a blind date during the first half, with all the attendant feelings. It is only during the second half, when the viewers are sated of curiosity about the characters, that the film gets interesting. ‘Preethse Preethse’ offers a number of opportunities for psycho-analysis". A critic from Sify.com wrote "Yogish dialogue delivery is a drawback. He has to improve his looks too via a good make up man. Pragna in her short presence steals the show. Udayatara in her debut Kannada film is quite OK. Ramesh Bhat and Jai Jagdish as caring parents give a precise performance".

References

2000s Kannada-language films
2009 films